Pope Sixtus IV (born Francesco della Rovere; 21 July 1414 – 12 August 1484) was head of the Catholic Church and ruler of the Papal States from 9 August 1471 to his death in August 1484. His accomplishments as pope included the construction of the Sistine Chapel and the creation of the Vatican Library. A patron of the arts, he brought together the group of artists who ushered the Early Renaissance into Rome with the first masterpieces of the city's new artistic age.

Sixtus founded the Spanish Inquisition through the bull Exigit sincerae devotionis affectus (1478), and he annulled the decrees of the Council of Constance. He was noted for his nepotism and was personally involved in the infamous Pazzi conspiracy, a plot to remove the Medici family from power in Florence.

Early life
Francesco was a member of Della Rovere family, a son of Leonardo della Rovere and Luchina Monleoni. He was born in Celle Ligure, a town near Savona.

As a young man, Della Rovere joined the Franciscan Order, an unlikely choice for a political career, and his intellectual qualities were revealed while he was studying philosophy and theology at the University of Pavia. He went on to lecture at Padua and many other Italian universities.

In 1464, Della Rovere was elected Minister General of the Franciscan order at the age of 50. In 1467, he was appointed Cardinal by Pope Paul II with the titular church being the Basilica of San Pietro in Vincoli.

Before his papal election, Cardinal della Rovere was renowned for his unworldliness and had written learned treatises, including On the Blood of Christ and On the Power of God.

His reputation for piety was one of the deciding factors that prompted the College of Cardinals to elect him Pope upon the unexpected death of Paul II at the age of fifty-four.

Papacy

Upon being elected Pope, Della Rovere adopted the name Sixtus, which had not been used since the 5th century. One of his first acts was to declare a renewed crusade against the Ottoman Turks in Smyrna. However, after the conquest of Smyrna, the fleet disbanded. Some fruitless attempts were made towards unification with the Greek Church. For the remainder of his pontificate, Sixtus turned to temporal issues and dynastic considerations.

Nepotism

Sixtus IV sought to strengthen his position by surrounding himself with relatives and friends. In the fresco by Melozzo da Forlì, he is accompanied by his Della Rovere and Riario nephews, not all of whom were made cardinals; the protonotary apostolic Pietro Riario (on his right), the future Pope Julius II/ Giuliano Della Rovere standing before him; and Girolamo Riario and Giovanni della Rovere, behind the kneeling Platina, author of the first humanist history of the popes.

His nephew, Pietro Riario, possibly also benefited from his alleged nepotism. He was successively promoted to be a cardinal, the bishop of Florence, the Patriarch of Constantinople and given some 45 additional benefices. Pietro became one of the richest men in Rome and was entrusted with Pope Sixtus IV's foreign policy, in addition to being given an unofficial post as the de facto ruler of Rome. He reportedly spent 200,000 gold ducats on foodstuffs and festivities during two years in office. Pietro died prematurely in 1474. Chroniclers of his life seem to regard his death as unnatural and thus connect his alleged grandiose spending habits and the impression they left on his contemporaries as causal.

Criticisms of Pietro's meteoric rise were not constrained to the charge of benefiting from nepotism as Sixtus IV's nephew, nor to allegations of possibly having been Sixtus IV's illegitimate son. Indeed, Pietro and his brother Girolamo Riario were alleged to have been lovers of Sixtus IV in polemics against the latter. According to the later published chronicle of the Italian historian Stefano Infessura, Diary of the City of Rome, Sixtus was a "lover of boys and a sodomite" awarding benefices and bishoprics in return for sexual favours and nominating a number of young men as cardinals. Sexualised polemics, in truth concerned with politics and not the sexual lives of their victims, were not uncommon during this time; but as Pfisterer notes "the novel flood of accusations of sodomy against a pope" and "true flood of corresponding lampoons, reviling poems, and fictional epitaphs" following his death are at the very least evidence for his contemporaries' opinions about the promotions of these young men.

The secular fortunes of the Della Rovere family began when Sixtus invested his nephew Giovanni with the lordship of Senigallia and arranged his marriage to the daughter of Federico III da Montefeltro, duke of Urbino; from that union came a line of Della Rovere dukes of Urbino that lasted until the line expired, in 1631. Six of the thirty-four cardinals that he created were his nephews.

In his territorial aggrandizement of the Papal States, his niece's son, Cardinal Raffaele Riario (for whom the Palazzo della Cancelleria was constructed) was suspected of colluding in the failed Pazzi conspiracy of 1478 to assassinate both Lorenzo de' Medici and his brother Giuliano and replace them in Florence with Sixtus IV's other nephew, Girolamo Riario. Francesco Salviati, Archbishop of Pisa and a main organizer of the plot, was hanged on the walls of the Florentine Palazzo della Signoria. Sixtus IV replied with an interdict and two years of war with Florence.

However, Infessura had partisan allegiances to the Colonna and so is not considered to be always reliable or impartial. The English churchman and Protestant polemicist John Bale, writing a century later, attributed to Sixtus "the authorisation to practice sodomy during periods of warm weather" to the "Cardinal of Santa Lucia". This prompted the noted historian of the Catholic Church, Ludwig von Pastor, to issue a firm rebuttal.

Foreign policy
Sixtus continued a dispute with King Louis XI of France, who upheld the Pragmatic Sanction of Bourges (1438), which held that papal decrees needed royal assent before they could be promulgated in France. That was a cornerstone of the privileges claimed for the Gallican Church and could never be shifted as long as Louis XI manoeuvred to replace King Ferdinand I of Naples with a French prince. Louis was thus in conflict with the papacy, and Sixtus could not permit it.

On 1 November 1478, Sixtus published the papal bull Exigit Sincerae Devotionis Affectus through which the Spanish Inquisition was established in the Kingdom of Castile. Sixtus consented under political pressure from Ferdinand of Aragon, who threatened to withhold military support from his kingdom of Sicily. Nevertheless, Sixtus IV quarrelled over protocol and prerogatives of jurisdiction; he was unhappy with the excesses of the Inquisition and condemned the most flagrant abuses in 1482.

As a temporal prince who constructed stout fortresses in the Papal States, he encouraged the Venetians to attack Ferrara, which he wished to obtain for another nephew. Ercole I d'Este, Duke of Ferrara, was allied with the Sforzas of Milan, the Medicis of Florence along with the King of Naples, normally a hereditary ally and champion of the papacy. The angered Italian princes allied to force Sixtus IV to make peace to his great annoyance.

For refusing to desist from the very hostilities that he himself had instigated and for being a dangerous rival to Della Rovere dynastic ambitions in the Marche, Sixtus placed Venice under interdict in 1483. He also lined the coffers of the state by unscrupulously selling high offices and privileges.

In ecclesiastical affairs, Sixtus promoted the dogma of the Immaculate Conception, which had been confirmed at the Council of Basle in 1439, and he designated 8 December as its feastday. In 1476, he issued the apostolic constitution Cum Praeexcelsa, establishing a Mass and Office for the feast. He formally annulled the decrees of the Council of Constance in 1478.

Slavery
The two papal bulls issued by Pope Nicholas V, Dum Diversas of 1452 and Romanus Pontifex of 1455, had effectively given the Portuguese the rights to acquire slaves along the African Coast by force or trade. Those concessions were confirmed by Sixtus in his own bull, Aeterni regis, of 21 June 1481. Arguably the "ideology of conquest" expounded in those texts became the means by which commerce and conversion were facilitated.

In November 1476, Isabel and Fernando ordered an investigation into rights of conquest in the Canary Islands, and in the spring of 1478, they sent Juan Rejon with sixty soldiers and thirty cavalry to the Grand Canary, where the natives retreated inland. Sixtus's earlier threats to excommunicate all captains or pirates who enslaved Christians in the bull Regimini Gregis of 1476 could have been intended to emphasise the need to convert the natives of the Canary Islands and Guinea and establish a clear difference in status between those who had converted and those who resisted. The ecclesiastical penalties were directed towards those who were enslaving the recent converts.

Princely patronage

As a civic patron in Rome, even the anti-papal chronicler Stefano Infessura agreed that Sixtus should be admired. The dedicatory inscription in the fresco by Melozzo da Forlì in the Vatican Palace records: "You gave your city temples, streets, squares, fortifications, bridges and restored the Acqua Vergine as far as the Trevi..."

In addition to restoring the aqueduct that provided Rome an alternative to the river water, which had made the city famously unhealthy, he restored or rebuilt over 30 of Rome's dilapidated churches such as San Vitale (1475) and Santa Maria del Popolo, and he added seven new ones. The Sistine Chapel was sponsored by Sixtus IV, as was the Ponte Sisto, the Sistine Bridge (the first new bridge across the Tiber since Antiquity), and the building of Via Sistina (later named Borgo Sant'Angelo), a road leading from Castel Sant'Angelo to Saint Peter.

All of that was done to facilitate the integration of the Vatican Hill and Borgo with the heart of Old Rome. That was part of a broader scheme of urbanization carried out under Sixtus IV, who swept the long-established markets from the Campidoglio in 1477 and decreed in a bull of 1480 the widening of streets and the first post-Roman paving, the removal of porticoes and other post-classical impediments to free public passage.

At the beginning of his papacy, in 1471, Sixtus had donated several historically important Roman sculptures that founded a papal collection of art, which would eventually develop into the collections of the Capitoline Museums. He also refounded, enriched and enlarged the Vatican Library. He had Regiomontanus attempt the first sanctioned reorganisation of the Julian calendar and increased the size and prestige of the papal chapel choir, bringing singers and some prominent composers (Gaspar van Weerbeke, Marbrianus de Orto and Bertrandus Vaqueras) to Rome from the north.

In addition to being a patron of the arts, Sixtus was a patron of the sciences. Before he became pope, he had spent time at the very liberal and cosmopolitan University of Padua, which maintained considerable independence from the Church and had a very international character.

As Pope, he issued a papal bull allowing local bishops to give the bodies of executed criminals and unidentified corpses to physicians and artists for dissection. It was that access to corpses which allowed the anatomist Vesalius, along with Titian's pupil Jan Stephen van Calcar, to complete the revolutionary medical/anatomical text De humani corporis fabrica.

Other activities

Consistories

The Pope created 34 cardinals in eight consistories held during his reign, among them three nephews, one grandnephew and one other relative, thus continuing the practice of nepotism that he and his successors would engage in during this period.

Canonizations and beatifications
Sixtus IV named seven new saints, with the most notable being Bonaventure (1482); he also beatified one person, John Buoni (1483).

Uppsala University
In 1477, Sixtus IV issued a papal bull authorizing the creation of Uppsala University – the first university in Sweden and in the whole of Scandinavia. The choice of this location for the university derived from the fact that the archbishopric of Uppsala had been one of the most important sees in Sweden proper since Christianity first spread to this region in the ninth century, as well as Uppsala being long-standing hub for regional trade. Uppsala's bull, which granted the university its corporate rights, established a number of provisions. Among the most important of these was that the university was officially given the same freedoms and privileges as the University of Bologna. This included the right to establish the four traditional faculties of theology, law (Canon Law and Roman law), medicine, and philosophy, and to award the bachelor's, master's, licentiate, and doctoral degrees. The archbishop of Uppsala was also named as the university's Chancellor, and was charged with maintaining the rights and privileges of the university and its members. This act of Sixtus IV had a profound long-term effect on the society and culture of Sweden, an effect which continues up to the present.

Death

Sixtus IV became ill on 8 August 1484; this illness worsened on 10 August while the pope was attending an event in Rome. He felt unwell that evening and was forced to cancel a meeting he was to hold with his cardinals the following morning. The Pope grew weaker during the night of 11 August and he was unable to sleep. Sixtus IV died the following evening – 12 August.

The envoy of the Medici family summed up Sixtus' reign in the announcement to his master, "Today at 5 o'clock His Holiness Sixtus IV departed this life – may God forgive him!"

Pope Sixtus's tomb was destroyed in the Sack of Rome in 1527. Today, his remains, along with the remains of his nephew Pope Julius II (Giuliano della Rovere), are interred in St. Peter's Basilica, in the floor in front of the monument to Pope Clement X. A marble tombstone marks the site.

His bronze funerary monument, now in the basement Treasury of St. Peter's Basilica, made like a giant casket of goldsmith's work, is by Antonio del Pollaiuolo. The top of the casket is a lifelike depiction of the Pope lying in state. Around the sides are bas-relief panels depicting allegorical female figures representing Grammar, Rhetoric, Arithmetic, Geometry, Music, Painting, Astronomy, Philosophy, and Theology—the classical liberal arts, with the addition of painting and theology. Each figure incorporates the oak tree ("rovere" in Italian), symbol of Sixtus IV. The overall program of the panels, their beauty, complex symbolism, classical references and their relative arrangement are compelling and comprehensive illustrations of the Renaissance worldview. None of them actually states how he died.

Cardinals

Sixtus created an unusually large number of cardinals during his pontificate (23) who were drawn from the roster of the princely houses of Italy, France and Spain, thus ensuring that many of his policies continued after his death:

Giuliano della Rovere (later Pope Julius II)
Stefano Nardini
Pedro González de Mendoza
Giovanni Battista Cybo (later Pope Innocent VIII)
Giovanni Arcimboldi
Philibert Hugonet
Jorge da Costa
Charles de Bourbon
Pierre de Foix le jeune
Girolamo Basso della Rovere
Gabriele Rangone
Pietro Foscari

Joan Margarit i Pau
Raffaele Sansoni Riario
Domenico della Rovere
Paolo Fregoso
Jorge Bardina
Giovanni Battista Savelli
Giovanni Colonna
Giovanni Conti
Juan Moles de Margarit
Giovanni Giacomo Sclafenati
Giovanni Battista Orsini
Ascanio Maria Sforza-Visconti

Portrayals
Pope Sixtus is portrayed by Raul Bova in the second season, and John Lynch in the third season of the TV series Medici: Masters of Florence.

See also

Notes

References

 Vincenzo Pacifici,Un carme biografico di Sisto IV del 1477, Società Tiburtina di Storia e d'Arte, Tivoli, 1921 
"The Historical Encyclopedia of World slavery", Editor Junius P. Rodriguez, ABC-CLIO, 1997, 
"Black Africans in Renaissance Europe", Thomas Foster Earle, K. J. P. Lowe, Cambridge University Press, 2005, 
"Christopher Columbus and the enslavement of the Amerindians in the Caribbean. (Columbus and the New World Order 1492–1992).", Sued-Badillo, Jalil, Monthly Review. Monthly Review Foundation, Inc. 1992. HighBeam Research. 10 Aug. 2009
"Castile, Portugal, and the Canary Islands: Claims and Counterclaims, 1344–1479", Joseph F. O'Callaghan, 1993, p. 287–310, Viator, Volume 24
"Variations of Popery", Samuel Edgar D.D. Internet Archive, Ebooks and Texts.

Further reading

 
 , father of Francesco della Rovere, Pope Sixtus IV
 Roberto Weiss The medals of Pope Sixtus IV (1471–1484) (1961)

 
1414 births
1484 deaths
Della Rovere family
People from Savona
Italian Friars Minor
University of Pavia alumni
Scotism
Academic staff of the University of Perugia
15th-century Italian Christian monks
Ministers General of the Order of Friars Minor
Franciscan popes
Renaissance Papacy
Italian popes
Popes
15th-century popes
Italian art patrons
Burials at St. Peter's Basilica